McIlwain is a surname. Notable people with the surname include:

Alfie McIlwain (born 1998), English actor
Charles Howard McIlwain (1871–1968), American historian and political scientist
Dallas McIlwain (born 1982), Australian rugby league player
David McIlwain (1921–1981), English science fiction writer
Douglas McIlwain (born 1968), English local politician Mayor of Huntingdon 
James McIlwain, American ophthalmologist
Stover McIlwain (1939–1966), American baseball player
Wally McIlwain (1903–1963), American football player
Zach McIlwain (born 1986), American national veterans advocate